Chictopia is an online fashion site based in San Francisco. The website
is designed for fashion enthusiasts and bloggers to create profiles, post outfits, set up online shops, and socialize with others interested in fashion. The site currently has over 255,000 users and more than 13 million page views per month.

History
Chictopia was founded by Helen Zhu, Corinne Chan, and Richard Ho in 2008. Zhu and Chan both attended University of California Berkeley, with Zhu graduating in mechanical engineering and Chan electrical engineering and computer science. Prior to Chictopia, Zhu worked for eight years in the web industry as a product manager, Chan as a software engineer and systems architect, and Ho as an integrated circuit designer.

Brand partnership
In 2009, the clothing brand American Apparel featured several active Chictopia users as models as part of an ad campaign that ran on the site and elsewhere titled, "Our Friends from Chictopia." In 2011, Chictopia ran its first “Influential Blogger of the Year” competition featuring eight rising fashion bloggers. In 2013, Chictopia held a social shopping event with American Apparel and Crossroads Trading Co. called “Shop it Like it’s Hot” in the SoMa District of San Francisco.

Overview
The website is designed for users interested in fashion and looking to refine and showcase their personal style. Users upload outfit photos, describe their physical traits, and connect to other users who share similar body types, complexion, and style. Users can get an idea of how clothes would look on themselves and how to style them in a relatable way, as opposed to fashion models.

Zhu has said she wants Chictopia to be what YouTube has been for filmmakers and what Myspace has been for musicians.

Teen Vogue named Chictopia "The Next Big Thing" shortly after its founding. Nylon lists the website in its "Top 4 Style Sites." Women's Wear Daily named Chictopia “Top six sites to watch”, along with Polyvore, Foursquare, and three others in 2010.

References

External links

Internet properties established in 2008
American social networking websites
Companies based in San Francisco
2008 establishments in California
Fashion websites